Pierina is an Italian and Spanish feminine given name. Notable people with the name include:

 Pierina Borsani (1909–1960), Italian female basketball player and athlete
 Pierina Carcelén, Peruvian actress, model and dancer
 Pierina Gilli (1911–1991), Italian Roman Catholic visionary
 Pierina Legnani (1868–1930), Italian ballerina
 Pierina Montenegro (born 1986), Uruguyan footballer
 Pierina Morosini (1931–1957), Italian Roman Catholic from Bergamo who was killed after a man tried to rape her
 Pierina Rivera Peruvian traveler and IT recruiter

See also
 Maria Pierina (1890–1945), Roman Catholic religious Sister

Italian feminine given names
Spanish feminine given names